
Year 519 (DXIX) was a common year starting on Tuesday (link will display the full calendar) of the Julian calendar. At the time, it was known as the Year of the Consulship of Iustinus and Cillica (or, less frequently, year 1272 Ab urbe condita). The denomination 519 for this year has been used since the early medieval period, when the Anno Domini calendar era became the prevalent method in Europe for naming years.

Events 
 By place 
 Britannia 
 Cerdic becomes the first king of the Kingdom of Wessex (according to the Anglo-Saxon Chronicle).

 Europe 
 The synagogues of Ravenna are burnt down in a riot; Theodoric the Great orders them to be rebuilt at Ravenna's expense.

 Asia 
 Anjang becomes ruler of the Korean kingdom of Goguryeo.

 By topic 
 Religion 
 March 28 – The Eastern and Western churches reconcile their differences, ending the Acacian Schism.
 Jacob of Serugh becomes bishop of Batnan (near modern Diyarbakir, Turkey).
 The Memoirs of Eminent Monks is compiled.
 In Ireland, the Diocese of Kildare is erected.

Births 
 Xuan Di, emperor of the Liang Dynasty (d. 562)

Deaths 
 Munjamyeong of Goguryeo, 21st king of Goguryeo

References